Opharus omissoides is a moth of the family Erebidae. It was described by Hervé de Toulgoët in 1981. It is found in Peru.

References

Opharus
Moths described in 1981
Moths of South America